Grigory Ivanovich Choglokov (November 4, 1867 – June 27, 1921) was a division commander of the Imperial Russian Army. At the beginning of World War I, he was a major general. He was promoted in 1915. After the October Revolution, he opposed the Bolsheviks and emigrated to Turkey.

Awards
Order of Saint Anna, 3rd class, 1899
Order of Saint Stanislaus (House of Romanov), 2nd class, 1904
Order of Saint Anna, 2nd class, 1908
Order of Saint Vladimir, 3rd class, 1912
Order of St. George, 4th class, 1915
Gold Sword for Bravery, 1915
Order of Saint Anna, 1st class, 1916
Order of Saint Vladimir, 2nd class, 1917

References

Sources
 Р. Г. Гагкуев, В. Ж. Цветков, С. С. Балмасов Генерал Келлер в годы Великой войны и русской смуты // Граф Келлер М.: НП «Посев», 2007 
 

1867 births
1921 deaths
Russian military personnel of World War I
Recipients of the Order of St. Anna, 3rd class
Recipients of the Order of Saint Stanislaus (Russian), 2nd class
Recipients of the Order of St. Anna, 2nd class
Recipients of the Order of St. Vladimir, 3rd class
Recipients of the Gold Sword for Bravery
Recipients of the Order of St. Anna, 1st class
Recipients of the Order of St. Vladimir, 2nd class